Land o' Lakes is an unincorporated community in Vilas County, Wisconsin, United States. It is located in the town of Land o' Lakes on U.S. Route 45. The community is located along the state line with Michigan; in the past, it has also been called Donaldson and State Line (also spelled Stateline).

Education
Land o' Lakes is part of the Northland Pines School District and has an elementary school that serves students in kindergarten through fifth grade. Students travel to the nearby city of Eagle River, Wisconsin for middle school and high school. Conserve School, a private semester school for high school juniors that focuses on environmental stewardship and outdoor activities, is located in the community.

Notable residents
Wendy Lansbach, Olympic gold medal swimmer

References

External links
Land o' Lakes Wisconsin Chamber of Commerce
Land o' Lakes Historical Society

Unincorporated communities in Wisconsin
Unincorporated communities in Vilas County, Wisconsin